The First Book of Songs (title in Early Modern English: First Booke of Songes or Ayres) is a collection of songs by John Dowland which includes one instrumental piece. The book was published in London in 1597 and was reprinted four times during the composer's lifetime.

The first edition was printed by Peter Short. It contains a dedication to the Lord Chamberlain, Sir George Carey, Baron Hunsdon, and his wife Elizabeth, Lady Hunsdon (née Elizabeth Spencer).

Music
The vocal writing is often described as lute songs, implying that it is written for solo voice and accompaniment. The music is set out this way in the Stainer & Bell edition, for example. However, the editions printed in the composer's lifetime give a different picture of the composer's intentions, because he offered more than one way of performing his music. All the songs in the First Book of Songs can be performed in a four-part version (as the title page suggests) and they thus come into the category of madrigals. 
 In his remarks ‘To the courteous Reader’, Dowland acknowledges the influence of the composer Marenzio, who had become well known in England as the result of the collection Musica Transalpina, containing madrigals of four, five and six parts, which appeared in 1588.

The instrumental piece is the duet for lute "My Lord Chamberlain, His Galliard (an invention for two to play upon one lute)".

Words
Most of the lyrics are anonymous, but the authors of a few of the songs have been identified, for example, Fulke Greville to whom the first number Vnquiet thoughts has been attributed.

Audiences hearing Dowland's songs in contemporary pronunciation often miss hearing rhymes that worked well originally (for example, die/sympathy in Come Again). In recent years, there has been interest in reviving the original pronunciation of the texts. An important scholar in this field is the linguist David Crystal, who as well as being involved in OP performance at Shakespeare's Globe has worked on song lyrics.

Sequel
In his address to the "courteous reader" at the beginning of the book, Dowland announced his intention to publish more songs. The Second Book of Songs appeared in 1600.

Recordings

Many solo singers have recorded individual songs from the First Book of Songs, for example the countertenor Alfred Deller (from the 1950s) and Sting in his album Songs from the Labyrinth (2006). Those who have recorded all the songs include the tenor Rufus Müller with Christopher Wilson (Decca, 1993) and the soprano Grace Davidson with David Miller (Hyperion, recorded 2016).
Rather than just have a solo singer, the Consort of Musick adopts a range of approaches. Their 1970s recording of the First Book for L' Oiseau-Lyre, part of a set Dowland - The Collected Works, featuring Emma Kirkby (soprano), John York Skinner (counter-tenor), Martyn Hill (tenor), and David Thomas (bass), has been reissued on CD.

References

External link

The First Book of Songs
1597 compositions
Music books